The 2016 East Coast Credit Union Tankard, the provincial men's curling championship of Nova Scotia, was held from January 19 to 24 at the Mayflower Curling Club in Halifax. The winning Jamie Murphy team represented Nova Scotia at the 2016 Tim Hortons Brier in Ottawa.

Teams
Teams are as follows:

Round-robin standings

Scores

January 19
Draw 1
Adams 6-5 MacLeod 
Murphy 8-2 Dexter
Thompson 6-2 Danbrook
Stevens 7-6 MacDougall

Draw 2
Thompson 8-5 Dexter  
Adams 8-6 MacDougall
Stevens 7-5 MacLeod  
Murphy 8-6 Danbrook

January 20
Draw 3
Stevens 8-1 Danbrook  
MacLeod 9-7 Thompson
Murphy 10-9 MacDougall   
Adams 7-3 Dexter

Draw 4
MacLeod 5-3 MacDougall
Dexter 7-5 Danbrook   
Stevens 6-5 Adams  
Thompson 10-9 Murphy

January 21
Draw 5
Adams 6-4 Danbrook
Murphy 6-5 MacLeod 
Thompson 8-5 MacDougall 
Stevens 6-2 Dexter

January 22
Draw 6
Stevens 6-5 Murphy  
Danbrook 12-7 MacDougall
Dexter 7-5 MacLeod
Adams 7-5 Thompson

Draw 7
Dexter 6-4 MacDougall
Stevens 6-5 Thompson
Murphy 7-5 Adams  
MacLeod 8-5 Danbrook

Playoffs

Semifinal
Saturday, January 23, 7:00 pm

Final
Sunday, January 24, 3:00 pm

References

2016 Tim Hortons Brier
Curling in Nova Scotia
Sport in Halifax, Nova Scotia
2016 in Nova Scotia